Voznesensk is a city in Mykolaiv Oblast (region) of Ukraine and the administrative  center of Voznesensk Raion (district). It hosts the administration of the Voznesensk urban hromada. The city has a population of

History 
This city was founded in 1795 on the site of the Cossack settlement of Sokoly after the liquidation of the Zaporozhian Sich.

Voznesensk received city status in 1938.

During World War II, the city was occupied by Axis troops from August 1941 until March 1944.

In January 1989, the population of the city was 43,881 people. 

Until 18 July 2020, Voznesensk was incorporated as a city of regional significance. It also served as the administrative center of Voznesensk Raion even though it did not belong to the raion. In July 2020, as part of the administrative reform of Ukraine, which reduced the number of raions of Mykolaiv Oblast to four, the city of Voznesensk was merged into Voznesensk Raion.

During the 2022 Russian invasion of Ukraine, the city saw shelling and fighting as part of the Battle of Mykolaiv and the Battles of Voznesensk. The city was a key objective for Russian forces, who sought to capture an important intersection on the route between Mykolaiv and Odesa, and cross the Southern Buh river immediately southwest of the city. Securing this intersection was an essential prerequisite for any subsequent offensive towards Odesa, as it would allow Russian tanks and armored fighting vehicles access to the most suitable highway to the city. The first battle began on March 2, when a Russian armored column was defeated by Ukrainian forces in the vicinity of Voznesensk, in a battle which the Wall Street Journal described as "one of the war's most decisive routs" up to that point. The Ukrainian army, in cooperation with local farmers, destroyed a strategically important bridge, over which the Russians aimed to cross the Southern Bug. Additionally, the Ukrainian fighters destroyed around 30 Russian tanks and armored vehicles and one helicopter, thereby preventing any further Russian advance towards Odesa and a nearby nuclear facility. The second battle of Voznesensk began on March 9, with Russian troops occupying the city for three days until Ukraine retook the city. Had the Russian-held Mykolaiv Military–Civilian Administration pushed northwards capturing Nova Odesa, Voznesensk would be the de jure capital of the oblast.

On August 20, 2022, a Russian airstrike on Voznesensk killed 9 civilians, 4 of which were children.

Transportation 
The Voznesensk railway station is an important stop along the Odesa railroad, with direct trains available to major cities including Kyiv and Dnipro. The main bus station offers many destinations including buses to Kyiv, Mykolayiv and Kherson. Local marshrutkas (route buses) run from the center to all of the cities' microregions and surrounding villages as well as every half-hour to Mykolayiv.

Education 
Voznesensk has nine schools, a lyceum, a technicum, and a college.

Recreation 
Voznesensk has many available recreational opportunities. The city is situated along the Southern Buh river, where residents swim, fish, and relax on the riverbanks. To the north of Voznesensk, near Pervomaisk, the Southern Buh flows through a canyon which is famous for its whitewater rafting and mountain climbing.  The stadium in the center of Voznesensk features a football pitch, tennis court, track, and playground. The sports club "VOSCO" in the third microregion has an indoor basketball/tennis court as well as a weight training room. In fall 2012, a new sports complex in the center, "Waterfall", opened, which has a swimming pool, training room and saunas.

Notable people 
 Yevgeny Kibrik (1906-1978), a well-known artist who was born and grew up in Voznesensk. There is a museum featuring his art on Sobornosti Street, formerly called Lenin Street.

Climate

Gallery

Notes

References

External links 

 Voznesensk at Encyclopedia of Ukraine

Cities in Mykolaiv Oblast
Cities of regional significance in Ukraine
Populated places on the Southern Bug
Populated places established in the Russian Empire
Populated places established in 1795
Yelisavetgradsky Uyezd